Settle is a market town and civil parish in the Craven district of North Yorkshire, England. Historically in the West Riding of Yorkshire, it is served by Settle railway station located near the town centre, and Giggleswick railway station which is a mile away. The main road through Settle is the B6480, which links to the A65, connecting Settle to Leeds, Ilkley, Skipton and Kendal. The town had a population of 2,421 in the 2001 Census, increasing to 2,564 at the 2011 Census.

History
Settle is thought to have 7th-century Anglian origins, its name being the Angle word for settlement. Craven in the Domesday Book shows that until 1066 Bo was the lord of Settle but after the Harrying of the North (1069–1071) the land was granted to Roger de Poitou.

In 1249 a market charter was granted to Henry de Percy, 7th feudal baron of Topcliffe by Henry III. A market square developed and the main route through the medieval town was aligned on an east–west direction, from Albert Hill, Victoria Street, High Street and Cheapside and on through Kirkgate. This road led to Giggleswick where the citizens attended the parish church. The first bridge over the River Ribble was mentioned in 1498.

During the English Civil War, the Cliffords, the lords of the manor were Royalists, but their subjects were not. John Lambert of Calton in Malhamdale, was a general in Cromwell's army and his troops camped at Settle in August 1651 while on the road to an encounter in Lancaster.

Infrastructure

Daniel Defoe wrote "Settle is the capital of an isolated little kingdom of its own surrounded by barren hills." Because of its remoteness Settle saw mostly local commerce. The old roads were pack horse trails and drovers' roads along hilltops because the valley was soft and swampy before field drainage and the dredging of stream estuaries.

In the 1700s textile industrialists supported by traders and landowners campaigned for a turnpike to connect with growing industrial towns. The minute book for the Keighley and Kendal Turnpike Trust shows that most investors were mill owners from the Giggleswick district. In 1827 the trust, having miscalculated the cost of road maintenance, was in debt by £34,000. When in 1877 the trust was terminated, the investors received on average 54% of their deposit. The investors benefited because Settle was now well connected and its cotton mills boomed. The mill owners imported coal and, like the heavy industries that exported agricultural lime and sandstone masonry, welcomed the turnpike for access via carrier waggons to the Leeds and Liverpool Canal at Gargrave. The first passenger stagecoach arrived in 1763. The Mail Coach was running regularly in 1786. The Union coach for passengers ran each way on alternate days in the early 1800s, and daily by 1840.

Railways
The "little" North Western Railway reached  in 1847 and in 1849 the railway company constructed Station Road from Giggleswick to Settle. In 1875, the Settle to Carlisle Railway was built, opening to goods traffic in 1875 and to passengers the following year when Settle railway station opened along with a goods warehouse, cattle pens, signal box and water cranes.

In the late 18th century cotton spinning became the town's main employment. Bridge End Mill was converted from corn milling to cotton spinning. John Procter operated mills at Runley and King's Mill which were taken over by his son Thomas. He built the row of workers' cottages, Procter's Row in Lower Kirkgate. In 1835, Dog Kennel Mill and Brennand's Weaving Shed, Settle had five mills employing 333 people.

Governance
Settle is served by a town council made up of 11 councillors. The Mayor is elected annually and the current Town Mayor is Dan Balsamini currently serving his 4th year in the role having been re-elected in 2019, 2020 & 2021. The Deputy Mayor is Debbie Rymer first elected in 2021.

Settle is in the Settle and Ribblebank ward of Craven District Council. The population of this ward at the 2011 Census was 3,581. There are two councillors both representing the Conservative party. The town is in the Ribblesdale division of North Yorkshire, where it is represented by a Conservative councillor. It is twinned with the French Mediterranean seaside town of Banyuls-sur-Mer.

Geography

Settle was part of the West Riding of Yorkshire. It is located in Ribblesdale, at the southern edge of the Yorkshire Dales, within a few miles of the Three Peaks. Immediately overlooking the town is Castlebergh, a  limestone crag, and to the east is Malham which was in the former Settle Rural District. The River Ribble provided power for Settle's former cotton mills, and is now being harnessed by Settle Hydro, a micro hydroelectric scheme, to provide 50 kW of power to the National Grid.

Television
Since the town is closest to the Lancashire & North Yorkshire border, local news and television programmes are provided by BBC North West and Granada Television that broadcast from Salford.

Tourism
Settle's market is held weekly on Tuesdays in the town-centre marketplace and in the Victoria Hall, a short distance away on Kirkgate. Settle Town Hall was sold by Craven District Council to a developer in October 2011. The Square is surrounded by local businesses, most of which are family-owned, with some offering items for sale unique to the Settle area.  The Naked Man is believed to be the oldest cafe in the country.

The Yorkshire Festival of Story brings internationally known and award-winning artists to the town and has a range of paid-for and free events suitable for all age ranges. The festival attracts visitors from around the world and audiences have more trebled in size since the first festival in 2010. The event is the largest of its kind in the North of England. The Yorkshire Festival of Story is produced by Settle Stories an arts and heritage charity based in the town.

The Folly is a 17th-century Grade I listed building on the main street. In 1996 the North Craven Building Preservation Trust purchased part of the Folly, restored it and opened it to the public in 2001. The Folly houses the Museum of North Craven Life and hosts exhibitions during the open season. There are permanent displays, including the Settle to Carlisle Railway, Robert (Mouseman) Thompson furniture and local history. The rest of the building has been purchased by the trust. The museum is independent and run by volunteers.

The Gallery on the Green is thought to be the smallest art gallery in the world: drawings, paintings, photographs and other works are housed in a former BT telephone kiosk. Gavagan Arts at Linton Court Gallery is situated in a courtyard off Duke Street. The gallery presents a series of temporary exhibitions of modern and contemporary art.

The Listening Gallery is an audio gallery in an old phone box. The gallery has changing exhibitions and is open 365 days a year and is free to enter.  The box is maintained and was created by Settle Stories.

The district has several caves where prehistoric remains have been found, the most notable being Victoria Cave, so-called because the inner chamber was discovered in 1837 on the day of Queen Victoria's accession. The cave is a geological SSSI and scheduled monument. Victoria Cave contained fossil remains. The earliest, at 130,000 years old, include mammoth, straight-tusked elephant, cave bear and hippopotamus, Bos primigenius, Rhinoceros leptorhinus and spotted hyenas (as a bed of hyena bones). They date to an Upper Pleistocene interglacial. After the last Ice Age the cave was used by hibernating brown bear and reindeer. Associated with the later deposits were a harpoon head carved from antler; flint implements and other ornaments. The discovery of flint is noteworthy as it is not found naturally in the area. Craven Museum & Gallery in Skipton has an exhibition of items which includes a bear's skull found in one of the caves.

Cultural
The composer Edward Elgar visited Settle on many occasions to visit his friend Dr Charles William Buck. There is a blue plaque at Cravendale to commemorate this.

Education
Settle has two schools, with Settle Primary School and Settle College. Settle Middle School closed as part of the money-saving measures taken by North Yorkshire County Council.
To the west of the town is Giggleswick School, one of the principal private schools in the North of England, founded in 1512.

Notable people
Richard Bache (1737–1811), merchant, American Postmaster General and son-in-law of Benjamin Franklin
George Birkbeck (1776–1841), founder of the Mechanics' Institutes; Birkbeck, University of London is named after him
Reverend Benjamin Waugh (1839–1908) founder of the NSPCC, commemorated by a plaque on what is now the Neil Wright Estate Agents in Settle town square
George Howson (1860–1919), reforming headmaster
Francis Morphet Twisleton (1873–1917), military leader and letter writer
Theodore Rigg (1888–1972), agricultural chemist
Annice Sidwells (1902–2001), radio singer
Claire Brooks (1931–2008), lawyer and politician
Don Wilson (1937–2012), England and Yorkshire cricketer
Susan Brookes (born circa 1943/44), television chef, born in Settle
Mike Harding (born 1944), singer and comedian
Emma Lonsdale (sportswoman – skiing) (born 1984), Winter Olympian 2014
James Newman (born 1985), singer, songwriter and the representative for the United Kingdom at the Eurovision Song Contest 2020 and 2021
John Newman (born 1990), soul singer
Dr James Frederic Riley FRSE (1912–1985) radiologist and finder of the link between mast cells and asthma
James Brown, guitarist from Pulled Apart by Horses attended Settle College

See also
Castleberg Hospital

References

External links

 Settle & the 3 Peaks History
 Caves in the Settle area
 Website for Settle Charter Market. Held on Tuesdays
 North Craven Historical Research Group
 Four town walks on history of Settle – Richard Preston and the Folly
 Museum of North Craven Life at The Folly

 
Towns in North Yorkshire
Market towns in North Yorkshire
Civil parishes in North Yorkshire
Craven District
Ribblesdale